Đỗ Thị Ngân Thương (born March 10, 1989, in Hanoi) is a Vietnamese artistic gymnast. Thương is the 2005 Southeast Asian Games and 2007 Southeast Asian Games champion on the balance beam and 2007 bronze medalist on the floor exercise. Thương competed at the 2007 World Artistic Gymnastics Championships, where she did not reach any event final.

Thương participated in the 2008 Summer Olympics, where she became the first gymnast to represent Vietnam in Olympic competition. She competed only in the preliminary round of competition, where among 82 gymnasts, she placed 15th on vault, 51st on balance beam, 79th on uneven bars, 82nd on floor exercise and 59th overall, and did not qualify for the all-around or individual event finals.

On August 15, 2008, the International Olympic Committee announced that Thương had tested positive for the banned substance furosemide. IOC medical commission chairman Arne Ljungqvist stated that Thương's use of furosemide was likely to be accidental, and the result of receiving poor information on doping restrictions. Nonetheless, she was expelled from the Olympic Games and her athlete accreditation was revoked.
In 2012, she competed in the 2012 London Olympic Games and did not advance to any finals.

References

External links
 
 

1989 births
Living people
Vietnamese female artistic gymnasts
Sportspeople from Hanoi
Gymnasts at the 2008 Summer Olympics
Gymnasts at the 2012 Summer Olympics
Olympic gymnasts of Vietnam
Doping cases in gymnastics
Gymnasts at the 2006 Asian Games
Gymnasts at the 2010 Asian Games
Southeast Asian Games gold medalists for Vietnam
Southeast Asian Games silver medalists for Vietnam
Southeast Asian Games medalists in gymnastics
Competitors at the 2003 Southeast Asian Games
Competitors at the 2005 Southeast Asian Games
Competitors at the 2007 Southeast Asian Games
Competitors at the 2011 Southeast Asian Games
Asian Games competitors for Vietnam
21st-century Vietnamese women
20th-century Vietnamese women